Tilakdhari Prasad Singh  is an Indian politician. He was a Member of Parliament, representing Kodarma, Jharkhand in the Lok Sabha the lower house of India's Parliament for 2 terms as a member of the Indian National Congress. He also served as member of legislative assembly from rajdhanwar Vidhan sabha in Giridih district. A total of 12 Lok Sabha elections have been held in the Koderma Lok Sabha constituency since then. In these 12 elections, Tilakdhari alone has fought eight times on a Congress ticket. Tilakdhari has the distinction of being the first and last Congress MP here. Tilakdhari, who fought eight times, has got success only twice here. For the first time, he fought this seat in 1984 and won. Won again in the 99 election for the second time, but could never return after that. Now on the ground of his old age , he has forwarded his political legacy in the hand of his younger son Dhananjay . Dhananjay is presently the president of District Congress Committee, Giridih .

References

External links
Official biographical sketch in Parliament of India website

Lok Sabha members from Bihar
Indian National Congress politicians
India MPs 1980–1984
India MPs 1999–2004
1938 births
Living people